Betmotion is an online gambling company headquartered in Curaçao.

Overview
In 2019, the gambling options consisted of sports betting, casino games (including poker) and bingo.

Also in 2019, Betmotion sponsored Brazilian beach volleyball players Carol Solberg and Maria Elisa for one season.

References

Online gambling companies of the Netherlands
Companies of Curaçao